Zittelloceras is an extinct genus of nautiloids from the order Oncocerida which are among a large group of once diverse and numerous shelled cephalopods, now represented by only a handful of species.

Zittleoceras, which is included in the family Oncoceratidae, is characterized by subcircular or slightly depressed cyrtoconic shells with ventral, suborthochoanitic empty siphuncles; the shell surface typically with crenulated transverse frills or distinct noncrenulated annulations. Zittleoceras has been found in middle and upper Ordovician sediments in North America and Scotland. (Sweet, 1964)

See also

 Nautiloid
 List of nautiloids

References
 Sweet, Walter C. 1964. Nautiloidea -Oncocerida; Treatise on Invertebrate Paleontology Part K(3), R.C. Moore (ed); Univ. Kans. press.
 Sepkoski, J.J. Jr. 2002. A compendium of fossil marine animal genera.Sepkoski's Online Genus Database (CEPHALOPODA)

Prehistoric nautiloid genera
Middle Ordovician first appearances
Late Ordovician extinctions
Paleozoic life of Ontario
Paleozoic life of Newfoundland and Labrador
Paleozoic life of Quebec